Allahdadani railway station is located in Pakistan.

See also
 List of railway stations in Pakistan
 Pakistan Railways

References

Railway stations in Shikarpur District
Railway stations on Kotri–Attock Railway Line (ML 2)